Brabby Kofigo (born 26 March 2001) is a Ghanaian professional footballer who plays as a defender for Ghanaian Premier League side Aduana Stars.

Career 
Kofigo joined Aduana Stars in January 2020 during the 2019–20 Ghana Premier League season. On 12 January 2020, he made his debut coming on in the 77th minute for Samuel Bioh in a 5–2 victory over Liberty Professionals. He played 3 league matches before the season was cut short as a result of the COVID-19 pandemic in June 2020. With the league set to restart in November 2020, for 2020–21 season, Kofigo's name was part of the squad list for the season.

References

External links 

 
 

Living people
2001 births
Association football defenders
Ghanaian footballers
Aduana Stars F.C. players
Ghana Premier League players